Bisi Alimi (born Ademola Iyandade Ojo Kazeem Alimi, 17 January 1975) is a Nigerian gay rights activist, public speaker, blog writer and HIV/LGBT advocate who gained international attention when he became the first Nigerian to come out on television.

Early life
Alimi was born in the Mushin district of Lagos to father Raski Ipadeola Balogun Alimi (a Nigerian police officer) and Mother Idiatu Alake Alimi (a university clerk). Alimi was raised in Lagos, where he attended primary and secondary school. He was the third in a family of five children from his mother, and sixth from a family of ten children from his father. He later changed his name to Adebisi Alimi.

Education
Bisi attended Eko Boys' High School in Lagos, and graduated in 1993. He led his school cultural dances, both at primary and secondary school, to many awards and honours. He was a member of his secondary school literary and debating society and a Social Prefect (in charge of organizing social activities) in his senior year. Also, in 1993, he gained admission into Ogun State Polytechnic, and would later study creative arts, majoring in theatre at University of Lagos. It was during his university education that his sexuality attracted media attention after Campus Lifestyle, the university's magazine outed him as a gay man. Prior to the magazine outing, Bisi had experienced much discrimination within the campus, including facing a disciplinary committee on the accusation of his gay status. Although he did graduate, he was almost denied his certificate as it was believed that his morals were unacceptable for an alumnus of the university.

He was admitted at Birkbeck College, University of London in 2011, where he earned his master's degree in Global Governance and Public Policy.

In 2019, he was offered the John Stopford Scholarship to study Masters in Executive Coaching at Meyler Campbell Coaching School.

Career
Prior to his public self-outing, Alimi began his advocacy career in the late 1990s in Nigeria when a number of his friends died from HIV/AIDS. After 2 years of community mobilization work (including condom distribution and safe-sex education) for Gay men and Men who have Sex with other Men (MSM) in Nigeria, he joined the Alliance Rights Nigeria (ARN) in 2002 as a Programme Director, developing and providing HIV/AIDS and sexual health services and support. In his capacity as ARN Programme Director, he was at the heart of developing the Nigerian MSM HIV prevention framework in 2004. He was trained by the International AIDS Alliance in 2004 as HIV project Designer, Community Mobiliser, Care, Support and Treatment. In 2005, he co-founded The Independent Project (later, The Initiative for Equal Rights) working as its executive director.

On 11 April 2007 he was forced to flee Nigeria following threats to his life. He was granted asylum in 2008 by the UK, where he has been resident since. On 8 December 2014 he was conferred with British citizenship. From 2007 to 2011, Alimi worked as African MSM Project Co-ordinator at Naz Project London. Alimi is currently the executive director of Bisi Alimi Foundation and a co-founder and director of Rainbow Intersection, as well as co-founder of The Kaleidoscope Trust for which he served as Director for Africa from 2012 to 2013. He has been a visiting lecturer at Freie Universitat Berlin and Humboldt University of Berlin. In 2015 Bisi Alimi founded the Bisi Alimi Foundation (BAF) registered in England and Wales, but operating in Nigeria as a result of the Same Sex Marriage Prohibition Act 2013 (SSMPA). He is currently the director of BAF.

New Dawn with Funmi

Alimi gained notoriety in 2004 when he became the first Nigerian gay man to appear on Nigerian national television as a guest on Funmi Iyanda's show New Dawn with Funmi, a talk show on the NTA. That same year, Bisi had been diagnosed with HIV, and on the show Alimi confirmed his sexuality as a homosexual and asked for social acceptance from the public. His decision to come out of the closet generated both admiration and death threats. Consequently, Alimi was disowned by his family and most of his friends - including some in the gay community - and ejected from his home. Also, New Dawn 's live format was cancelled. Future guests on the pre-recorded version were screened by NTA executive producers to avoid what was considered "causing public offence".

Activism

In early 2004, Alimi attended the 4th National Conference on HIV/AIDS held in Abuja where he voiced HIV concerns amongst Nigerian gay men. He was later to become a Nigerian gay rights activist leading several peaceful protests and social dialogues to demand acceptance of homosexuals in Nigeria. In July 2005, The Independent Project for Equal Rights-Nigeria was founded by Alimi with a group of friends. He served as executive director of this organization where he pioneered several Nigerian LGBT Youth Group initiatives until April 2007. He also worked as director of Nigeria youth programmes at Alliance Rights organization. However, his controversial interview on national television in 2004 had become catalyst for the proposed motion on "Anti-Same Sex Bill" of 2006 that was presented to lawmakers in the Nigerian National Assembly. The motion for this controversial "Anti-Same Sex" bill was presented before the legislative house three times between 2006 and 2011.

Now residing in London, Alimi has continued his advocacy on gay rights within migrant African communities. He has worked for organizations in the UK including Naz Project London, Michael Bell Research and Consultancy and HIV i-Base. He has also worked with AHPN, and he was selected a member of the IAS youth for Mexico 2008 and was a member of the AmfAR review panel for the international grants for African MSM AIDS initiative 2009 and 2011 respectively.

Apart from sexual rights advocacy, Alimi has also organised protests against UK policies that are capable of inciting racial prejudice.

He founded Bisi Alimi Foundation in 2015 to accelerate social acceptance for LGBT in Nigeria.

Awards

Alimi is a recipient of and nominee for several awards. He has also been included in the "Independent on Sunday" Pink List of most influential LGBT people in Britain in 2011, 2012, 2013, peaking at number 90 in 2012.

He was listed third on the 100 most influential Non White Atheist and Free thinkers in Britain and Northern Ireland.

On New Year's Day, 2014, he was added to The Gay UK LGBT 2014 Honour List in recognition of his exemplary work for 'Education in the LGBT Community' and he has been nominated for the "Out In The City" magazine's Diversity Champion of the Year Award. The Out In The City award is known as "UK LGBT Oscar".

See also 
 Bobrisky 
 Denrele Edun
 Yinka Jegede-Ekpe

References

External links
 Independent Project for Equal Rights-Nigeria
 

1975 births
Living people
People from Lagos
Yoruba activists
Nigerian gay writers
Nigerian LGBT rights activists
People with HIV/AIDS
HIV/AIDS activists
University of Lagos alumni
Alumni of Birkbeck, University of London
Nigerian expatriates in the United Kingdom
Moshood Abiola Polytechnic alumni
Eko Boys' High School alumni
Nigerian former Muslims
Nigerian atheists
Nigerian refugees
Refugees in the United Kingdom
21st-century Nigerian LGBT people
Residents of Lagos